Battlesuit is a board game published by Steve Jackson Games in 1983.

Gameplay
Battlesuit is a two-player combat board wargame set in the same 21st century nuclear war of Ogre and G.E.V.. The game deals with the man-to-man conflicts where both sides use powered armor-clad infantry with micro-nuke-firing weapons.

Reception
In the May-June 1983 edition of The Space Gamer (Issue No. 63), Craig Sheeley gave a positive review, saying, "Battlesuit quite accurately represents one hex of overrun combat from G.E.V., and is just as deadly. For those who would follow the progress of the world of 2085, this game is a must."

In the June 1984 edition of Dragon (Issue #86), Jerry Epperson praised the tactics which made it "a game of cat-and-mouse as both players feint and probe, looking for weaknesses in the opponent's force." Epperson's only concern was the programmed morale checks, which he felt didn't reflect the humanity and varying personalities of the soldiers. Epperson concluded, "Nitpicking aside, Battlesuit is a fun little game. Those who are looking for a 'realistic' simulation will be disappointed, but if you like 'shoot-‘em-up' games, this one fills the bill well."

References

Board games introduced in 1983
Steve Jackson Games games